Kellock is a surname. Notable people with the surname include:

Alastair Kellock (born 1981), Scottish rugby union player
Billy Kellock (1889–1958), English football player and manager
Billy Kellock (born 1954), Scottish footballer
Brian Kellock (born 1962), Scottish jazz pianist
David Taylor Kellock (1913–1988), Australian stained glass artist 
Fiona Kellock (born 1948), Scottish swimmer
Roy Kellock (1893–1975), Canadian Supreme Court Justice
Thomas Kellock (1923–1993), British judge and politician